St Michael's is a Gaelic Athletic Association club based along the Sligo-Leitrim border comprising the Sligo portion of the parish of Killanummery and Ballintogher in County Sligo, Republic of Ireland.

Honours

 Sligo Junior Football Championship: (3)
 1992
 2016
 2019
 Sligo Junior Football League (Division 5): (20
 1998, 2006
 Kiernan Cup: (1)
 1999

Notable managers
 Cyril Haran

References

Gaelic games clubs in County Sligo